In mathematical logic, a definable set is an n-ary relation on the domain of a structure whose elements satisfy some formula in the first-order language of that structure. A set can be defined with or without parameters, which are elements of the domain that can be referenced in the formula defining the relation.

Definition 

Then:
 if and only if 
The bracket notation here indicates the semantic evaluation of the free variables in the formula.

Examples

The natural numbers with only the order relation 

Let  be the structure consisting of the natural numbers with the usual ordering. Then every natural number is definable in  without parameters. The number  is defined by the formula  stating that there exist no elements less than x:

and a natural number  is defined by the formula  stating that there exist exactly  elements less than x:

In contrast, one cannot define any specific integer without parameters in the structure  consisting of the integers with the usual ordering (see the section on automorphisms below).

The natural numbers with their arithmetical operations 

Let  be the first-order structure consisting of the natural numbers and their usual arithmetic operations and order relation. The sets definable in this structure are known as the arithmetical sets, and are classified in the arithmetical hierarchy. If the structure is considered in second-order logic instead of first-order logic, the definable sets of natural numbers in the resulting structure are classified in the analytical hierarchy. These hierarchies reveal many relationships between definability in this structure and computability theory, and are also of interest in descriptive set theory.

The field of real numbers 

Let  be the structure consisting of the field of real numbers. Although the usual ordering relation is not directly included in the structure, there is a formula that defines the set of nonnegative reals, since these are the only reals that possess square roots:

Thus any  is nonnegative if and only if . The enlarged structure  is called a definitional extension of the original structure. It has the same expressive power as the original structure, in the sense that a set is definable over the enlarged structure from a set of parameters if and only if it is definable over the original structure from that same set of parameters.

The theory of  has quantifier elimination. Thus the definable sets are Boolean combinations of solutions to polynomial equalities and inequalities; these are called semi-algebraic sets. Generalizing this property of the real line leads to the study of o-minimality.

Invariance under automorphisms 

An important result about definable sets is that they are preserved under automorphisms.
Then for all ,

 if and only if 

This result can sometimes be used to classify the definable subsets of a given structure. In fact, since any two integers are carried to each other by a translation and its inverse, the only sets of integers definable in  without parameters are the empty set and  itself. In particular, any automorphism (translation) preserves the "distance" between two elements.

Additional results 

The Tarski–Vaught test is used to characterize the elementary substructures of a given structure.

References 
Hinman, Peter. Fundamentals of Mathematical Logic, A K Peters, 2005.
Marker, David. Model Theory: An Introduction, Springer, 2002.
Rudin, Walter. Principles of Mathematical Analysis, 3rd. ed. McGraw-Hill, 1976.
Slaman, Theodore A. and Woodin, W. Hugh. Mathematical Logic: The Berkeley Undergraduate Course. Spring 2006.

Model theory
Logic
Mathematical logic